The Citadel–Wofford football rivalry is an American college football rivalry game played by The Citadel Bulldogs football team of The Citadel, The Military College of South Carolina and the Wofford Terriers football team of Wofford College.  The Citadel is located in Charleston, South Carolina, while Wofford is located in Spartanburg, South Carolina.  The schools were two of the last colleges in the United States to integrate women into their respective student bodies, with Wofford admitting women in 1976 and The Citadel in 1996.  The two schools are also both highly ranked academically by reviewers such as U.S. News & World Report.

When played in Spartanburg, the matchup is referred to as the Beacon Iced Tea Bowl, after the owners of the Beacon Iced Tea Company, with one co-owner each who graduated from The Citadel and Wofford.

History
The series dates to 1916, when the Bulldogs defeated the Terriers 37–0 in Charleston.  Wofford won the second matchup, in Spartanburg in 1919, by a score of 12–0.  The Citadel has dominated the rivalry historically, posting winning streaks of 15 games and 13 games, though Wofford maintained a 16-game win streak from 1999 through 2014.  These win streaks, combined with closely fought games in recent years, have led to the growth of the rivalry between the two schools.

The Terriers and Bulldogs have met in three neutral sites, Augusta, Georgia, Wilmington, North Carolina, and Orangeburg, South Carolina as part of the Orangeburg Country Fair in the 1950s.  Wofford won 5 of 8 matchups in Orangeburg, while the Bulldogs claimed the games in Augusta and Wilmington.  From 1967 until 1998, one year after the Terriers joined the Southern Conference, the teams met in Charleston exclusively, with The Citadel winning 19 of 22 matchups.

Game results

Other varsity sports

See also  
 List of NCAA college football rivalry games

References

College football rivalries in the United States
The Citadel Bulldogs football
Wofford Terriers football